Lincoln University (Lincoln U) is a public, historically black, land-grant university in Jefferson City, Missouri. Founded in 1866 by African-American veterans of the American Civil War, it is a member-school of the Thurgood Marshall College Fund. This was the first black university in the state. In the fall 2021, the university enrolled 1,794 students.

History

During the Civil War, the 62nd Colored Infantry regiment of the U.S. Army, largely recruited in Missouri, set up educational programs for its soldiers. At the end of the war it raised $6,300 to set up a black school, headed by a white abolitionist officer, Richard Foster and founded by James Milton Turner, a student and protege of John Berry Meachum. Foster opened the Lincoln Institute in Jefferson City in 1866. Lincoln had a black student body, both black and white teachers, and outside support from religious groups. The state government provided $5,000 a year to train teachers for the state's new black school system. Under the Morrill Act of 1890, Missouri designated the school a land-grant university, emphasizing agriculture, mechanics and teaching.

By 1921, the college had expanded to offer graduate programs and was officially designated a university by the state of Missouri. It changed its name to Lincoln University of Missouri. In 1954, it opened its doors to applicants of all ethnicities. It provides both undergraduate and graduate courses.

On May 22, 2019, Jefferson City was hit by an EF-3 Tornado, causing significant damage to the historic President's Residence near the campus.

In May 2021, Lincoln University President Jerald Woolfolk announced her plans to step down at the end of the current school year.

Presidents

Athletics

Lincoln University athletic teams are the Blue Tigers. The university is a member of the Division II level of the National Collegiate Athletic Association (NCAA), primarily competing in the Mid-America Intercollegiate Athletics Association (MIAA) since the 2010–11 academic year (which they were a member on a previous stint from 1970–71 to 1998–99, but later left because it had not had a football team since after the 1989 fall season). The Blue Tigers previously competed in the Heartland Conference, of which it was a founding conference member, from 1999–2000 to 2009–10.

Lincoln competes in nine intercollegiate varsity sports: Men's sports include basketball, football, golf and track & field; while women's sports include basketball, cross country, golf, softball and track & field.

The school revitalized its football program and re-entered the MIAA in 2010. The Lincoln University Women's Track Team made NCAA Division II history by winning the Outdoor Track and Field Championships five consecutive times.

Alma Mater "Lincoln, O, Lincoln"
The alma mater is sung to the tune of "Ach wie ist's möglich dann", a German folk song published in 1827 and variously credited to Georg Heinrich or Friedrich Silcher Kuchen (the West Point and Wake Forest alma mater songs use the same melody).

Student activities
Founder's Day, traditionally held on the first Saturday of February, pays tribute to the founders of Lincoln University. Homecoming, usually held in October, is a celebratory time when family and friends of Lincoln University convene to participate in gala activities. Springfest, usually held in late April, celebrates the arrival of spring with games and other activities throughout the week.

Marching Musical Storm
The "Marching Musical Storm" is the university's marching band. It was founded in 1948 and is one of the largest student organizations on campus. The band performs at all home football games, select basketball games, and other school-sanctioned functions throughout the year.

Student media
 The Clarion (university newspaper)
 KJLU (radio station)
 JCTV (Public-access television)

Fraternities and sororities 
The National Pan-Hellenic Council organizations that have chapters at Lincoln University of Missouri are:

Notable faculty and staff
Alan T. Busby - First African American alumnus of the University of Connecticut in 1918.
Joseph Carter Corbin - First principal of University of Arkansas at Pine Bluff
Myrtle Craig Mowbray - First African American woman to graduate from Michigan State University (then known as Michigan Agricultural College), in 1907|
Althea Gibson - black tennis pioneer, Wimbledon, French Open, and US Open champion who was an athletics instructor in the early 1950s
Lorenzo Greene - black historian who taught at the university (1933–1972)
Robert Nathaniel Dett - composer
Oliver Cromwell Cox - a member of the Chicago School of Sociology and early world-systems theorist who taught at Lincoln (1949–1970)

Notable alumni
Oleta Crain - Advocate for black women's rights and desegregation
Rita Heard Days - Member of both houses of the Missouri State Legislature
Lloyd L. Gaines - Disappeared mysteriously after fighting for the right to equal education
Dorothy Butler Gilliam - First African-American female reporter at the Washington Post Co-founder of the National Association of Black Journalists.
Exie Lee Hampton - active in YWCA, NAACP, Urban League, and settlement work in southern California
George Howard, Jr. - First African-American federal judge in Arkansas
Leo Lewis - Member of the Canadian Football Hall of Fame
Carey Means - Voice of Frylock on Aqua Teen Hunger Force
Zeke Moore - Former NFL defensive back
Oliver Lake - Jazz musician
Julius Hemphill - Jazz musician
Lemar Parrish -  Former eight-time pro bowl National Football League (NFL) defensive back in the 1970s and early 1980s, and former head coach of the Blue Tiger football team from 2004 to 2009
Wendell O. Pruitt -  Captain Pruit was a fighter pilot with the famed 332nd Fighter Group (the Tuskegee Airmen)
Romona Robinson - Award-winning Cleveland television news presenter
Joe Torry - Actor and comedian
Ronald Townson - American vocalist. He was an original member of The 5th Dimension, a popular vocal group of the late 1960s and early 1970s.
Maida Coleman - Senate Minority leader in Missouri
Blaine Luetkemeyer - U.S. Congressman
William Tecumseh Vernon - Bishop of the African Methodist Episcopal Church, and a former president of Western University
Joshua Peters (2009) One of the youngest members of the Missouri State House of Representatives, and a former SGA president
Moddie Taylor (1935) African American chemist who worked on the Manhattan Project and became the head of Howard University's Chemistry Department from 1969 to 1976
Ann Walton Kroenke - Walmart heiress and sports team owner, nursing degree
John Collins Muhammad - City of St. Louis Alderman & Activist

References

External links

 
 Official athletics website

 
Buildings and structures in Jefferson City, Missouri
University and college buildings on the National Register of Historic Places in Missouri
Land-grant universities and colleges
Historically black universities and colleges in the United States
Educational institutions established in 1866
Public universities and colleges in Missouri
Education in Cole County, Missouri
1866 establishments in Missouri
Historic districts on the National Register of Historic Places in Missouri
National Register of Historic Places in Cole County, Missouri